Killer Company: James Hardie Exposed is a 2009 Australian book by journalist Matt Peacock.

Overview
The book documents how the use of harmful asbestos fibre in building materials produced by James Hardie Industries "led to the deaths of thousands of workers and customers, who were never informed of the dangers". Working with asbestos products, such as "fibro", resulted in medical abnormalities, such as asbestosis. The book opens with the story of Bernie Banton, former James Hardie employee, who suffered from asbestos-induced fibrosis and later died.

According to Peacock, James Hardie Industries circumvented the rules and regulations designed to protect the community from serious health hazards. Peacock states that "Hardie embarked on a cold, calculated strategy to maximise profits, minimise compensation and conceal the culprits".

Awards and legacy
Killer Company was a finalist for the Walkley non-fiction book of the year in 2009.
Devil's Dust, a docudrama based on Killer Company, was released in 2012, with Ewen Leslie portraying Peacock.

References

Australian non-fiction books
2009 non-fiction books
2009 in the environment
Environmental non-fiction books
Books about multinational companies
Asbestos